Agonoxena pyrogramma is a moth of the family Agonoxenidae. It is found on the Solomon Islands.

References

Agonoxeninae
Moths described in 1924
Moths of Oceania